The Seokbong Ceramic Museum is a ceramics museum in Seoul, South Korea.

The museum was opened in October 1997 by the ceramist Seokbong Cho Muho. The exterior of the museum is in the form of the typical two-storey Korean building. Its walls are decorated with ceramic paintings. The museum displays various ceramic artworks, including a painting of the Baekdu Mountain, one of Korea's largest mountains. Facilities at the museum include a demonstration room, international pavilion, and model pavilion. There is an outdoor stage in the garden to the rear of the museum.

See also
 Ceramic art
 List of museums in South Korea

References

External links
 Museum website

Art museums established in 1997
Art museums and galleries in Seoul
Biographical museums in South Korea
Ceramics museums
1997 establishments in South Korea